The Challenge of Ireland was a golf tournament on the Challenge Tour, held in Ireland. It was played from 2005 to 2009.

Robert Coles won the 2009 event in a playoff over Belgian Nicolas Colsaerts.

Winners

See also
Irish Challenge, a Challenge Tour event held in Ireland which began in 2015

External links
Coverage on the Challenge Tour's official site

Former Challenge Tour events
Golf tournaments in the Republic of Ireland
Golf in County Kildare
Golf in Leinster
Recurring sporting events established in 2005
Recurring sporting events disestablished in 2009
2005 establishments in Ireland
2009 disestablishments in Ireland